Obilokwu Mbieri is a village in southeastern Nigeria located near the city of Owerri.

References 

Towns in Imo State